The Old Alleynian Football Club is an open rugby union club founded as a team for the old boys of Dulwich College, themselves known as Old Alleynians. Founded in 1898, it is one of the oldest clubs in London and was the last of London's old boys clubs to become a fully open club. It is notable not only for its longevity, but also for the prominence it once attained on the club circuit and for the number of eminent players that have been members of the club, some of whom gained their international caps whilst at the club.

The club runs four senior sides and have a flourishing junior set up with many players going onto to play 1st team rugby. After winning London 3 South West in 2011-12 the 1st XV have been competing at Level 7 ever since, finishing a club high 3rd position in London 2 South East at the end of the 2019-20 season. The 2nd XV entered the RFU league ladder system in Kent 3 for the 2022-23 season, the 3rd and 4th XV play in the Kent Metropolitan Leagues.

History
Dulwich College had been playing football using Rugby School rules since 1858 and the school had been playing against scratch sides of old boys since the 1890s. In October 1897 a former pupil of Dulwich College wrote to the school magazine (The Alleynian) bemoaning the fact that despite the school having an old boy representative "in almost all the first-class football clubs" the fact that it did not have an old schoolboy team, "such as Old Merchant Taylors, Old Leysians, Old Carthusians, Marlborough Nomads", meant that it was missing out on "the greater athletic reputation [it] would otherwise have obtained." Within a few months R.M. Everett, a member of the school's first XV, and William Leake, an Assistant Master at the school and former Cambridge rugger Blue, had joined forces to promote the formation of the club. In June 1898 Leake published an invitation in "The Alleynian" to "all OAs desirous of joining". In September 1898, the club played its first match, drawing with Croydon 3rds (Croydon FC being the name by which Old Whitgiftians were known at the time). On 8 October 1898, the club's first general meeting was held, rules approved, officers elected and the dark blue, light blue and black hooped jerseys were decided upon.

The club was regarded as one of the best in London by 1913 and in that year five of its players, who had all played together in the school's 1st XV, were selected to play in the Varsity Match. The five were J. E. Greenwood, Cyril Lowe, Eric Loudoun-Shand, Graham Donald and W. D. Doherty. They were known at the school as the "famous five", having played in an unbeaten school side, all going on to play in the Varsity Match and all going on to represent their countries, two as captain.

In World War I the club lost 76 members but Leake, "Slacker" Christison and Major Everett revived the club by 1919 and the club (and therefore the school to which it was affiliated) produced the captains of both Oxford and Cambridge in the Varsity Match. This was the first and only team this had happened. The 1920s saw the clubs strength grow and it produced its first international cap (to be won by a player playing for the club) in 1927 in the person of Kendrick Stark. In 1931 Eric Whiteley repeated the distinction. The club had over 600 members and was beating clubs like Rosslyn Park.

The Second World War took a heavy toll on the members, with 49 losing their lives. So weakened was the club that it merged with its oldest of rivals, Old Whitgiftians, for a year in 1945. A modest resurgence took place at the turn of the decade, with Ian Coutts gaining his Scottish caps, and the likes of London Irish, London Welsh and Wasps falling to the OAs. However, by the late 1960s the OAs played strong local opposition rather than "1st class" clubs. In the 1980s the club continued to be strong, arguably the strongest of all Old Boys clubs in London, with the topping of the Combined London Old Boys Merit Table in 1988 as testament to this. In 1987 the league system introduction led to the club being placed in the Courage League London South 2. In 1989 the club were promoted to London One, won the Surrey Rugby Union Cup, topped the Combined London Old Boys Merit Table once again and qualified for the Middlesex Sevens Finals.

A second Surrey Cup win in 1992 was unfortunately followed by a three year slide seeing the club drop three divisions and in 1995 the Old Alleynians became the last of the Old Boys clubs to become fully open membership. The most recent success came in 2003, when the Old Alleynians beat Shipston upon Stour 16 -10 in the final of the Powergen Junior Vase, held at Twickenham.

Ground
The club played on the Norwood club's ground in Norwood Park between 1899 and 1901. A semi-nomadic existence then ensued as the club moved on a yearly basis from Elm Grive, Sydenham to Cavendish Road, Merton to Horn Park Farm, Lee. Then in 1905 the Dulwich Estate allowed the club to settle at Dulwich Common where they play to this day. In 2003 a fire saw the club lose half of its clubhouse, which was rebuilt shortly afterwards.

Notable former players

Notable chiefly as rugby players

International caps whilst playing for OAs
 - Kendrick Stark (1904–1988), England international (first capped 1927)
 - Eric Cyprian Perry Whiteley (1904–1973), England international (first capped 1931)
 - Ian Coutts (1928–1997), Scotland international (first capped 1951)

Internationals and first class players

Professional era 
Toby Fricker (Wing) (b. 1995), professional rugby union player for Bristol Bears.
Tom O'Flaherty (rugby union) (Wing) (b. 1994), professional rugby union player for Exeter Chiefs.
Tom Mercey (Prop) (b. 1987), professional rugby union player for Northampton Saints and England U20's.
Mark Easter (No. 8 or Flanker) (b. 1982), ex-professional rugby union player for Northampton Saints and Sale Sharks.
 - David Flatman (Prop) (b. 1980), ex-professional rugby union player for Saracens, Bath and England (8 Caps).
 - Andrew Sheridan (Prop) (b. 1979), ex-professional rugby union player for Sale Sharks, England (40 Caps) and British & Irish Lions (2005) & (2009).  
 - Nick Easter (No. 8) (b. 1978), ex-professional rugby union player for NEC Harlequins and England (54 Caps).
Sam Blythe (Hooker) (b. 1976)  ex-professional rugby union player for Exeter Chiefs.
Nick Lloyd (Prop) (b. 1976) ex-professional rugby union player for Saracens; selected for Scotland in 2006 but had to withdraw due to injury.
 - Beno Obano (Prop) (b. 1994), professional rugby union player for Bath: selected for England in 2021 (1 Cap)

Amateur era 
 - C. H. Scott Rugby Union International for Argentina (first represented Argentina in 1922)
 - C. T. Mold (b. 1885) Rugby union international for Argentina (first represented Argentina in 1911)
 - K. G. Drysdale Rugby union international for Argentina (first represented Argentina in 1911)
 - W. H. Bridger Rugby union international for Argentina (first represented Argentina in 1911)
British & Irish Lions - George Isherwood (1889–1974) Rugby union international for Great Britain (first represented Great Britain in 1910)
British & Irish Lions - David Trail (1875–1935), represented a forerunner of the British & Irish Lions, known as the Anglo-Welsh on their tour of Australasia in 1904.
 - Cyril Mowbray Wells (1871–1963) – Played Rugby Union for England as well as being a first-class cricketer (represented Cambridge University, Surrey and Middlesex as a Right-handed and bowler.)
 - Group Captain Cyril Nelson "Kit" Lowe MC DFC RAF (1891–1983) English rugby union footballer representing England in 25 consecutive matches, First World War flying ace, and supposedly the inspiration for W. E. Johns' character "Biggles".
 - Jock Hartley (1879–1960)  Rugby union international for England (first represented England in 1902)
 - J. E. Greenwood (1891–1975) Rugby union international for England (first represented England in 1912) Later captained England.
 - W. D. Doherty (1893–1966) Rugby union international for Ireland (first represented Ireland in 1921) Later captained Ireland
 - E. G. Loudoun-Shand (1893–1972) Rugby union international for Scotland (first represented Scotland in 1913)
 - Grahame Donald (1891–1976) Rugby union international for Scotland (first represented Scotland in 1914)
 - A. L. Wade (1884–1917) Rugby union international for Scotland (first represented Scotland in 1908)
 - E. A. Cleugh (1894–1964) – Rugby Union International for Uruguay (first represented Uruguay in 1922)
 - C. E. Cat Rugby Union International for Uruguay (first represented Uruguay in 1922)
 - J. M. Cat – Rugby Union International for Uruguay (first represented Uruguay in 1922)
 - L. P. Bridal – Rugby Union International for Uruguay (first represented Uruguay in 1922)

Notable chiefly in other fields
Edward George, Baron George
Roger Knight

Club honours
London 2 South champions:
1988–89
London 3 South West champions:
2011-12
RFU Junior Vase winners:
2002-03
Surrey Cup winners (2): 
1989, 1992

See also
:Category:People educated at Dulwich College
Dulwich College

References

External links
 Old Alleynian Football Club

Football Club
English rugby union teams
Rugby clubs established in 1898
1898 establishments in England
Rugby union clubs in London
Sport in the London Borough of Southwark
Dulwich College